

Prehistory
13,000 BC

The earliest evidence of man's interest in insects is from rock paintings. The insects depicted are bees  A carving of a cave cricket from the Cave of the Trois-Frères approximates in date.

1800–1700 BC

Bees were significant in other early civilisations, for instance at Malia, Crete, where jewellery depicts two golden bees holding a drop of honey.

Egypt, Greek and Roman empires
Scarab Beetle painted on wall of Rameses IX tomb c. 1000 BC

Bee-keeping was particularly well developed in Egypt and was discussed by the Roman writers Virgil, Gaius Julius Hyginus, Varro and Columella.

620–560 BC 
Aesop's Fables relate stories of grasshoppers, ants and other insects.

343 BC (circa]

Aristotle writes History of Animals In this work Aristotle includes insects in a class "Entoma" which also includes the arachnids and the myriapods but not the Crustacea which formed another class "Malacostraca" of the "Anaema" or "bloodless animals." ("Insecta" is the Latin translation of Aristotle's εντομον (Entomon). Parts of Animals on zoological anatomy followed. For nearly 2000 years the few writers who dealt with zoological subjects followed Aristotle's leading.

AD 77–79 
Pliny the Elder publishes Naturalis Historia

847 
Rabanus Maurus authors the encyclopaedia De rerum naturis "On the Nature of Things"

10th–15th century AD
 Great chain of being

1061
Shen Kuo described the role of predatory insects in protecting crops from insect pests.

1172 
Guido of Ravenna

1230-1245  
Thomas of Cantimpré writes Liber de natura rerum  an encyclopedia of natural history

1240
Bartholomeus Anglicus De proprietatibus rerum, "On the Properties of Things"
 
1250
 Vincent of Beauvais Speculum Naturale treats insects, especially bees.

1250(circa)
The first documented forensic entomology case is reported by Song Ci in the medico-legal text book Xiyuan Jilu. He describes the case of a stabbing near a rice field.

1258
Albertus Magnus treats insects in De animalibus.

1350
Konrad of Megenberg Buch der Natur. The first natural history in the German language. The section "Von den Würmen". Written in 1350, Buch der Natur was first printed in moveable type in 1475. NCSU Libraries owns a fragment of the fourth describes insects—both real and imaginary—and reptiles.

15th century

Carlo Crivelli draws an association between flies and death in a painting of the Madonna and Child.

16th century
Although the earliest pictorial record of a natural history cabinet is the engraving in Ferrante Imperato's Dell'Historia Naturale (Naples 1599) such collections became more than rudimentary early in this century.

1503
The Grandes Heures of Anne of Brittany has accurate marginal illustrations of plants and insects

1505
Albrecht Dürer paints a stag-beetle.

1551
Zoologist Conrad Gesner publishes the first volume of Historia animalium or History of Animals. The work includes some mention of insects.

1556
Guillaume Rondelet a professor in Montpellier publishes De insectis et zoophytis liber.

1575
Joris Hoefnagel begins Animalia Rationalia et Insecta finished 1580.

1578
Li Shizhen includes very many insects amongst the 1000 animals described in Bencao Gangmu.

17th century

1602

Ulisse Aldrovandi's Animalibus insectis libri septem, cum singulorum iconibus AD vivum expressis published. This work was devoted to the insects and some other invertebrates

1609

 The Feminine Monarchie is published by Joseph Barnes, Oxford, the first full-length English-language book about beekeeping. The title expresses the main idea that the colony is governed, not by a king-bee, as Aristotle claimed, but by a queen-bee. https://en.wikipedia.org/wiki/Charles_Butler_(beekeeper)

1630

Jacob Hoefnagel Diversae Insectarum Volatium icones ad vivum accuratissimè depictae per celeberrimum pictorem. (Amsterdam), Nicolao Ioannis Visscher.

1634

Insectorum sive Minimorum Animalium Theatrum by Thomas Muffet with Edward Wotton, Conrad Gesner and Thomas Penny posthumously published – Contains first image of butterfly from North America, a woodblock print from a painting by John White in 1587.

1646

Wenceslaus Hollar publishes  Muscarum scarabeorum in Antwerp

1653

Joannes Jonstonus Theatrum Universale Omnium Animalium: Insectorum, Tabulis Viginti Octo ab Illo Celeberrimo Mathia Meriano, Aeri Incisis Ornatum ex Scriptoribus tam Antiquis, Quam Recentioribus – Heilbrunnensis: Franciscus Iosephus Eckebrecht, 1757 (Heilbrunnensis : Ioh. Adami Sigmundi): a compilation of Konrad Gesner's (1516–1565) and Ulisse Aldrovandi's (1522–1605) natural histories but plates engraved by Matthäus Merian.

1654
Eleanor Glanville is born.

1655
Samuel Hartlib wrote The Reformed Commonwealth of Bees

1662 – (Between 1662 and 1667)
Jan Goedart publishes Metamorphosis and historia naturalis illustrating, by copper plate engravings, the metamorphosis of various insects.

1664 Robert Hooke publishes Micrographia.

1668

Erasmus Finx Erasmi Francisci Ost- und West- Indischer wie auch Sinesischer Lust- und Stats-garten mit Einem Vorgespräch von Mancherley Lustigen Discursen; in Drey Haupt-theile Unterschieden. Nürnberg in verlegung J. A. Endters und Wolfgang dess jüngern sel. erben.

1669
Microscopist Jan Swammerdam publishes History of Insects correctly describing the reproductive organs of insects and metamorphosis.
The anatomist Marcello Malpighi publishes a treatise on the structure and development of the silkworm, the first description of the anatomy of an invertebrate.

1674
Johann Daniel Major Catalogus oder Index Alphabeticus von Kunst, Antiquitäten, Schatz und fürnehmlich Naturalien-Kammern, Conclavia, Musea, Repositoria, oder auch nur kleinere Serinia Rerum Naturalium Selectorum, Kiel: outlines a collection strategy for museums and lists collections.

1679
Bohuslav Balbín begins Miscellanea historica regni Bohemiae with Liber naturalis – the Nature of Bohemia which contains notes on insects.

1683
Ole Borch Dissertationes academicae de poetis

1685
Jan Goedart publishes De Insectis, in methodum redactus, cum notularum additione. Opera M.Lister; item appendicis ad historiam Animalium Angliae.
Anton Leeuenhoek publishes Arcana Naturae Detecta.

1688
Steven Blankaart Schou-Burg der Rupsen, Wormen, Maden en Vliegende Dierkens daar uit voortkomende. Door eigen ondervindinge by een gebragt in English Showplace of caterpillars, worms, maggots and flying things published in Amsterdam

1691
 Filippo Bonanni Observationes circa Viventia, quae in Rebus non-Viventibus
 
Observationes circa Viventia, quae in Rebus non-Viventibus an important work.

1696
 The Royal Society of England publishes the studies of the Italian anatomist Marcaello Malpighi the discoverer of the insect excretory organs known as Malpighian tubules.

1696 – (from 1696 to 1700)
Antonio Vallisneri's Dialoghi will sopra the curiosa Origine di molti Insetti, in English, "Dialogues on the curious origin of several insects", in which he, with Francesco Redi and Malpighi, contradicts the theory of spontaneous generation of maggots.

18th century

The development of entomology in the 18th century

In the 18th century three kinds of entomological text appeared. Firstly there were illustrative works – showy insects often beautifully coloured whose purpose was sensual. An example is afforded by Maria Sybilla Merian's Metamorphosis Insectorum Surinamenis (1705).

Secondly were descriptive and systematic (classificatory) works usually confined to what are now known as the Insecta. Of the second kind Carl von Linne's 10th edition of Systema Nature published in 1758 at Stockholm stands proud. In this work the binomial system was finally settled on. Thirdly were works on developmental biology (life cycles), internal anatomy, physiology and so on. These often covered other invertebrate groups. An example is René Antoine Ferchault de Réaumur's Memoires pour Servir a L’Historie des Insectes.

1700–1750

1700
Prussian Academy of Sciences founded in Berlin.

1702
James Petiver publishes a celebrated butterfly work Lepidoptera of the Philippine Islands.
1702 is also the date of the world's oldest pinned insect specimen; a Bath White butterfly preserved in Oxford University Museum.

1705
Maria Sybilla Merian Metamorphosis Insectorum Surinamenis (Transformations of the insects of Surinam) published by G. Valck in Amsterdam. It is a masterpiece of both art and science and Maria Merian, "the mother of entomology", was the first to record the full life cycle of many species of butterflies and moths.
John Ray publishes Methodus Insectorum.

1710
John Ray publishes Historia insectorum in English, Study of Insects. This is the first attempt at a systematic classification of insect species.
Francois Xavier Bon de Saint Hilaire writes on the use of spider silk as a textile. This was the first such research.

1715
1715 -Levinus Vincent publishes Wondertooneel der Nature the Wonder Theater of Nature

1717
James Petiver publishes a book on British butterflies entitled Papilionum Brittaniae.

1720
Eleazar Albin publishes A Natural History of English Insects.
Charles de Geer born

Johann Leonhard Frisch 1720-1738 Beschreibung von allerley Insecten in Teutschland Berlin (1720–1738)

1730
Moses Harris (1730–1788) born in England. Harris was a pioneer of the use of wing venation in insect systematics.
 
1731
Mark Catesby publishes part one of The Natural History of Carolina, Florida and the Bahama Islands.

1734
Scientist René Antoine Ferchault de Réaumur publishes the first Mémoires pour Servir à L’Histoire des Insectes in English, "Memoirs Serving as a Natural History of Insects". This is a founding work of entomology, and one of the most important of all zoological works of the 18th century.

1737
Microscopist Jan Swammerdam's Biblia naturae or "Book of Nature" is reissued. Describing his studies of insects, it is a founding work of entomology. It is in Latin. Swammerdam's co-authors were Herman Boerhaave and Hieronymus David Gaubius.

1738
Adolph Modeer born.

1739
John K'Eogh publishes Zoologica Medicinalis Hibernica, in English, "Zoological Medicine in Ireland".

1740
 Charles Bonnet discovers parthenogenesis by observing that female aphids could reproduce without fertilization.

1745
Johan Christian Fabricius (1745–1808) is born. Fabricius worked on all insect orders.
Charles Bonnet published his first work on entomology. Entitled Traité d'insectologie, it collected together his various discoveries regarding insects.

1746
August Johann Rösel von Rosenhof publishes Insecten-Belustigung, in English, "Insect Entertainment".

1748
 Georg Dionysus Ehret publishes first part of Plantae et Papiliones Depictae.
James Dutfield publishes English Moths and Butterflies.

1749
Benjamin Wilkes publishes English Moths and Butterflies.
Georges-Louis Leclerc, Comte de Buffon Histoire naturelle, générale et particulière (1749–1788) commenced— 36 volumes and 8 additional volumes published after his death by Bernard Germain Étienne comte de La Ville-sur-Illon La Cépède.Until the publication of this encyclopedia it was thought that all animals were created together by God about 6,000 years ago. Not only did this 44 volume encyclopedia contain all biological knowledge of its time, it offered a different theory. 100 years before Darwin, Buffon claimed that man and ape might have a common ancestor. His work also had significant impact on ecology.

1750–1800

1752
Maria Theresa of Austria instructs Gerhard van Swieten to establish Vienna as an important centre of natural science. Many entomologists train there.
Landgravine Caroline Louise of Hesse-Darmstadt founds Staatliches Museum für Naturkunde Karlsruhe

1753
Louisa Ulrika of Prussia founded the Royal Swedish Academy of Letters, History and Antiquities. Carl Linnaeus named the butterflies in her Drottningens insektsskåp or Drottningen Insect Cabinet 

1757
First volume of Carl Alexander Clerck's Svenska Spindlar published. Describing a number of spiders in binomial nomenclature, it was the first work to employ Linnaeus's binomial system, which had been proposed in his 1753 work Species Plantarum.

1758
Tenth edition of Carl Linnaeus' Systema Naturae  published. World explorers brought back to Europe so many exotic plant and animal specimens that chaos loomed for the 18th-century naturalists attempting to identify, classify, and communicate what they had gathered. Linnaeus made a great contribution to science by developing systems of classification to organize these processes. His principles of organization, especially his system of binomial nomenclature, provided essential tools for entomology. The tenth edition (1758–59), was chosen as the starting point for zoological nomenclature.
George Edwards Gleanings of Natural history exhibiting figures of Quadrupeds, Birds, Insects, Plants etc. London

1759
Johann Christian Daniel Schreber Schreberi Novae Species Insectorvm published.

1760
Naturalist and engraver Pieter Lyonnet publishes a monograph on the goat-moth caterpillar, containing details and illustrations of dissections. It is one of the best illustrated books on anatomy ever produced and describes over 4,000 muscles.

1761
Jacob Hübner (1761–1826) born. Jacob Hübner was the first great world lepidopterist. Before Hübner it was held that there were few genera of Lepidoptera, a view he overthrew. His definitions of genera are among the best of the time and so were his classifications.
Christiaan Sepp publishes Nederlandische Insecten, in English, "Dutch insects".
Johann Heinrich Sulzer published Die Kennzeichen der Insekten, nach Anleitung des Königl. Schwed. Ritters und Leibarzts Karl Linnaeus – The characteristics of insects, according to the instructions of Carl Linnaeus.

1762
Hans Strøm publishes as Physisk og Oeconomisk Beskrivelse over Fogderiet Søndmør I-II in Copenhagen (1762–1766).

1763
Giovanni Antonio Scopoli publishes Entomologia Carniolica.
Johann Wilhelm Meigen (1763–1845) born. Meigen began to work on Diptera at the age of twenty five. The first specialist in Diptera Meigen described a vast number of European species and his work on gross taxonomy laid the foundations of the present higher classification of the Order. Unlike his Swedish contemporary Carl Friedrich Fallen he based higher categories on a combination of characters not following Fabricius in using mouthpart characters alone. This new approach was controversial.Centuria Insectorum by Carl Linnaeus defended as a thesis by Boas Johansson

1764
Carl Friedrich Fallen (1764–1830) born. Johan Christian Fabricius attended Linnaeus's lectures on natural classification. He was one of Linnaeus' most important pupils.
Étienne Louis Geoffroy published Histoire des Insectes.

1765
Johann Eusebius Voet Catalogus Systematicus Coleopterorum published.
Job Baster Opuscula subseciva, observationes miscellaneae de animalculis et plantis quibusdam eorum ovariis et seminibus continentia. Haarlem

1766
Moses Harris publishes The Aurelian or Natural History of English Insects, namely Moths and Butterflies. This was the first book on the British Lepidoptera. Harris was a pioneer in using wing venation in insect systematics. A more modern revision did not appear until 1803.

1767
 Voyages of the HM Bark Endeavour under Captain James Cook begin. The extensive insect collections made on the expeditions, the first to Newfoundland, the next to the South Pacific are held in the Natural History Museum in London though a few are to be found in the Natural History Museum, Dublin.

1770
Johann Reinhold Forster publishes A Catalogue of British Insects at Warrington, England – "This catalogue contains 1000 insects; the Swedes have near 1700, it would therefore be an honour to this country to scrutinize carefully into the various branches of Natural History, and to give the public as perfect and extensive catalogues of British Animals as possible".
Dru Drury, 1770–1782 Illustrations of natural history, wherein are exhibited figures of exotic insects, a three-volume work commenced at London.
Christian Rudolph Wilhelm Wiedemann (1770–1840) born. He was a specialist in Diptera (world species).
1770s Siegmund Adrian von Rottemburg in part takes over Johann Siegfried Hufnagel's lepidopterological collection.

1771
Johann Reinhold Forster produces first list of American insects.
William Curtis publishes Instructions for collecting and preserving insects; particularly moths and butterflies. Illustrated with a copper-plate, on which the nets, and other apparatus necessary for that purpose are delineated…1772
Empress Maria Theresa of Austria founds the Académie Impériale et Royale of the Sciences et belles Lettres de Bruxelles in Belgium. It becomes a centre for Low Countries entomology.
Christoph Friedrich Richter publishes Lehrbuch einer Naturhistorie zu einem gemeinnützigen Gebrauche1773
Gesellschaft Naturforschender Freunde zu Berlin founded.

1774Der Naturforscher (transl. "The Naturalist") commenced then published yearly to 1804
John Coakley Lettsome The naturalist's and traveler's companion, containing instructions for collecting and preserving objects of natural history and for promoting inquiries after human knowledge in general, London: E. and C. Dilly (1774): a much used work on collecting.
Johann Bernhard Basedow publishes Elementarwerk, in English "Elementary Book" which includes sections on natural history and insects.

1775
First part of Pieter Cramer's 1775–82 De Uitlandische Kapellen (Papillons Exotiques de Trois Partes de Monde published.
Johan Christian Fabricius' Systema entomologica  published.

1776
Otto Friedrich Müller published Zoologiae Danicae Prodromus. 
Peter Brown published New illustrations of Zoology1777
Johann Ludwig Christian Gravenhorst (1777–1857) born (see his wikipage in French). Gravenhorst worked mainly on Ichneumonidae.
Eugenius Johann Christoph Esper Europaischen Schmetterlinge commenced publication.

1778
 Pierre-Justin-Marie Macquart (1778–1855) born. Macquart worked mainly on Diptera describing many world species.

1779
Jacob Christian Schäffer Icones insectorum circa ratisbonam indigenorum coloribus naturam referentibus expressaepublished.
1779–1780 Johann Friedrich Blumenbach Handbuch der Naturgeschichte. 12 editions and some translations. Published first in Göttingen by J. C. Dieterich

1780
The Society of Entomologists of London formed (short-lived).
Caspar Stoll's Natuurlyke en naar 't leeven naauwkeurig gekleurde Afbeeldingen en Beschryvingen der Cicaden en Wantzen, in alle vier Waerelds Deelen Europa, Asia, Africa en America huishoudende, by een verzameld en beschreeven published.
Pierre Françoise Marie Auguste Dejean (1780–1845) born.

1781
Franz Paula von Schrank Enumeratio insectorum Austriae indigenorum published at Vienna.
August Wilhelm Knoch publishes  Beyträge zur Insektengeschichte in Leipzig. Three volumes 1781, 1782, 1783.
James Barbut publishes The genera insectorum of Linnæus exemplified in various specimens of English insects drawn from nature.

1782
Encyclopédie Méthodique commenced. Its popularity and ubiquity later ensuring the entomological tableau which appeared from 1817 onwards had a wide audience.
Clas Bjerkander Insect-Calender, för år 1781. Kongliga Vetenskaps Academiens Nya Handlingar 3 (4–6): 122–132. Stockholm.
Heinrich Gottlob Lang First edition of Verzeichniss seiner Schmetterlinge, in den Gegenden um Augsburg published by Maria Jakobina Klett in Augsberg.

1783
Andreas Johann Retzius publishes Genera et species insectorum.
Johan Adam Pollich Descriptio insectorum Palatinorum. Act. Leopoldina VII.
Johann August Ephraim Goeze Entomologische Beyträge zu des Ritter Linné zwölften Ausgabe des Natursystems published in Leipzig.

1785
Publication, in Berlin, of Carl Gustav Jablonsky and Johann Friedrich Wilhelm Herbst Natursystem aller bekannten in- und ausländischen Insecten, als eine Fortzetsung der von Büffonschen Naturgeschichte. Nach dem System des Ritters Carl von Linné bearbeitet or, in English, "Natural system of all well-known in [Europe] and foreign Insects, as a continuation of Buffon’s natural history. After the system of the honoured master, Carl von Linné". This is a superbly illustrated work on world and European Coleoptera. Jablonsky was private secretary to the Queen of Prussia.
Johann Wilhelm Zetterstedt (1785–1874) born. Zetterstedt worked mainly on Diptera.
Antoine François, comte de Fourcroy Entomologia Parisiensis, sive, Catalogus insectorum quae in agro Parisiensi reperiuntur ..., co-written with Étienne Louis Geoffroy, published in this year, was a major contribution to systematic entomology.

1786
Johann Nepomuk von Laicharting Verzeichniss und Beschreibung der Tyroler-Insecten. Lists and descriptions of Tirol insects.
Ernst Friedrich Germar born.

1787
Thomas Say (1787–1834) born.

1788 
Linnean Society of London founded. The Society published many important works on insects.
Caspar Stoll Representation des Spectres ou Phasmes, des Mantes...Sauterelles des Grillons et des Blattes published. This work contains beautiful plates of praying mantis species.
Guillaume-Antoine Olivier Entomologie ou Histoire Naturelle des Insectes, avec leurs Caracteres Generiques et Specifiques, leur Description, leur Synonomie et leur Figure Illuminee. Coleopteres. commenced publication in Paris. The first volumes preceded Latreille's in time and the system used was a combination of Linne and Fabricius.
Johann Wilhelm Meigen commences study of Diptera.
Naturhistorieselskabet founded in Denmark
Johann Jacob Roemer Genera Insectorum Linnaei et Fabricii, Iconibus Illustrata published.
Carl Peter Thunberg Dissertatio Entomologica Novas Insectorum species sistens, cujus partem quintam. Publico examini subjicit Johannes Olai Noraeus, Uplandus. Upsaliae published.
Johann Kaspar Füssli Neue Magazin für Liebhaber der Entomologie (last part 1786).
Charles Joseph Devillers publishes Caroli Linnaei entomologia1789. 
August Batsch Versuch einer Anleitung, zur Kenntniß und Geschichte der Thiere und Mineralien, für akademische Vorlesungen entworfen, und mit den nöthigsten Abbildungen versehen.  Zweyter Theil. Besondre Geschichte der Insekten, Gewürme und Mineralien, in English Provisional guide to the knowledge, development and history of the animals and minerals, designed for academic lectures Part 2 The particular history of insects, on worms, and minerals.

1790
Jan Daniel Preysler publishes Verzeichnis böhmischen Insekten in Prague.

1791
John Curtis (1791–1862) born.
Johann Ludwig Christ publishes Naturgeschichte, Klassifikation und Nomenklatur der Insekten vom Bienen, Wespen und Ameisengeschlecht.

Johann Gottlob Schneider begins publication of Neues Magazin für Liebenhaber der Entomologie. Strasland

1792
The Dublin Society purchases the natural history collection of Nathaniel Gottfried Leske containing 2,500 species of insects from Europe and the "rest of the World". The sale catalogue was titled Museum Leskeanum. Pars entomologica ad systema entomologiae. CL. Fabreicii ordinata etc.. Leske was from Leipzig and the collection contained (s) Johan Christian Fabricius’ and Johann Friedrich Gmelin's types as well as his own.
Edward Donovan The Natural history of British Insects commenced publication in London.
Josef Aloys Frölich, Bemerkungen über einige seltene Käfer aus der Insektensammlung des Herrn Hofr. und Prof. Rudolph in Erlangen. Der Naturforscher 26: 68–165, Halle.

1793
Georg Wolfgang Franz Panzer Faunae Insectorum Germanicae Initia oder Deutschlands published.
William Dandridge Peck "The Description and History of the Canker Worm" Mass. Mag. Vol.7. Peck was the first Native American entomologist.
Carl Ulisses von Salis-Marschlins Reisen in verscheidene Provinzen des Königreichs Neapel published in Zürich und Leipzig.
Leonardo De Prunner Catalogus larvarum EuropaeChristian Konrad Sprengel Das entdeckte Geheimnis der Natur im Bau und in der Befruchtung der Blumen published in Berlin. A classic work on pollination.

1796
Gustav von Paykull's Fauna Suecica and Johann Karl Wilhelm Illiger's Kugelann Verzeichniss der Kafer Prussens commenced publication. Illiger's work was a summary of Paykull's revisions of Swedish beetles.
Carl Henrik Boheman (1796–1868) born in Jönköping, Sweden. Boheman worked mainly on Coleoptera, especially Chrysomelidae and Rhynchophora.

1797
John Abbot and James Edward Smith The Natural History of the Rarer Lepidoptera of Georgia. A masterwork with than 100 beautifully coloured plates.
Pierre André Latreille. Precis des Caracteres Generiques des Insectes disposes dans un Ordre Naturel published. It proposed “ Natural classes and genera are based not only on the mouthparts, the wings or the antennae, but on careful observation of the entire structure, even of the smallest differences".Jean Victoire Audouin (1797–1841) born.

1798
Edward Donovan An Epitome of the Natural History of the Insects of China published in London. It is a famed work of entomological art.
Joseph Phillipe de Clairville Helvetische Entomologie published in Zurich.
Andre Jean Baptiste Robineau-Desvoidy (1799–1857) born in France. Robineau-Desvoidy worked mainly on Diptera.
Charles Nodier Dissertation sur l'usage des antennes dans les insectes, Paris.

1799
Jean Baptiste Alphonse De Chauffour de Boisduval (1799–1879) born. This eminent lepidopterist was one of the original members of the Société Entomologique de France. He wrote fifty publications mainly on Lepidoptera but also on Coleoptera and Homoptera. He described the Lepidoptera taken on the voyages of L'Astrolabe and La Coquille.
Jean Antoine Coquebert de Montbret Illustratio iconographica insectorum quae in musaeis parisinis''. Paris: P. Didot, commenced (finished in 1804).

See also
Timeline of entomology – for a list of other available time periods
List of entomologists
Science in the Age of Enlightenment

References

External links
List of taxon authorities
NZETC Differences between British and French Organization of Zoological Exploration in the Pacific 1793–1840

Entomology
Entomology - 1799